Larsen Marabe (misspelled Marabe ) is a Papua New Guinean rugby league footballer who plays for the Rabaul Gurias. He was a member of the Kumuls' squads for the 2010 Four Nations and 2013 World Cup.

In 2012 he played in New South Wales.

References

External links
Team Profiles at RLFourNations.com

1986 births
Living people
Expatriate rugby league players in Australia
Featherstone Rovers players
Papua New Guinea national rugby league team players
Papua New Guinean expatriate rugby league players
Papua New Guinean expatriate sportspeople in Australia
Papua New Guinean rugby league players
Rabaul Gurias players